Gary Foord (born 14 September 1970) is a British former cyclist. He competed in the men's cross-country mountain biking event at the 1996 Summer Olympics.

References

External links
 

1970 births
Living people
British male cyclists
Olympic cyclists of Great Britain
Cyclists at the 1996 Summer Olympics
Sportspeople from Leicester
20th-century British people
21st-century British people